Levitation or transvection, in the paranormal or religious context, is the claimed ability to raise a human body or other object into the air by mystical means. 

While believed in some religious and New Age communities to occur due to supernatural, psychic, or "energetic" phenomena, there is no scientific evidence of levitation occurring.  Alleged cases of levitation can usually be explained by natural causes such as trickery, illusion, and hallucination.

Religious views
Various religions have claimed examples of levitation amongst their followers. This is generally used either as a demonstration of the validity or power of the religion, or as evidence of the holiness or adherence to the religion of the particular levitator.

Buddhism
 It is recounted as one of the Miracles of Buddha that Gautama Buddha walked on water levitating (crossed legs) over a stream in order to convert a brahmin to Buddhism.
Yogi Milarepa, a Vajrayana Buddhist guru, was rumored to have possessed a range of additional abilities during levitation, such as the ability to walk, rest and sleep; however, such were deemed as occult powers.

Christianity

 According to three gospels, Jesus walked on the water of Lake Galilee to meet his disciples who were in a boat.
 Saint Mary of Egypt, walked across the river Jordan according to her hagiographer, the hermit Zosimas of Palestine
 Saint Bessarion of Egypt (died ), is said to have walked across the waters of the river Nile
 Francis of Assisi, founder of the Franciscan Order, is recorded as having been "suspended above the earth, often to a height of three, and often to a height of four cubits".
She called the experience a "spiritual visitation".
 Saint Martín de Porres (1579–1639), a lay brother of the Dominican Order, claimed psychic powers of bilocation, being able to pass through closed doors (teleportation), and levitation.
 Joseph of Cupertino (1603–1663), a Franciscan Friar, reportedly levitated high in the air, for extended periods of more than an hour, on many occasions.
 Alphonsus Liguori (1696–1787), when preaching at Foggia, was purportedly lifted before the eyes of the whole congregation several feet from the ground.
 Girolamo Savonarola, sentenced to death, allegedly rose off the floor of his cell into midair and remained there for some time.
 Seraphim of Sarov (1759–1833), Russian Orthodox saint, allegedly had a gift to levitate over the ground for some time, witnessed by many educated people of his time, including the emperor Alexander I of Russia.
 Mariam Baouardy (or "Mary of Jesus Crucified", 1846–1878), a Discalced Carmelite nun of the Melkite Greek Catholic Church, experienced frequent ecstasies. She was purportedly seen levitating more than once by others: for example, in the garden of the monastery during times of private prayer, when living in the Carmelite monastery at Pau, in France.

"Demonic" levitation in Christianity
 Simon Magus is recorded in the Acts of Peter as levitating above the Forum in Rome in order to prove himself to be a god. The apostle Peter intervenes, causing Magus to drop from the sky, breaking his legs "in three parts".
 Clara Germana Cele, a young South African girl, in 1906 reportedly levitated in a rigid position. The effect was apparently only reversed by the application of Holy water, leading to belief that it was caused by demonic possession.
 Magdalena de la Cruz (1487–1560), a Franciscan nun of Cordova, Spain.
 Margaret Rule, a young Boston girl in the 1690s who was believed to be harassed by evil forces shortly after the Salem Witchcraft Trials, reportedly levitated from her bed in the presence of a number of witnesses.

Gnosticism
Simon Magus, a Gnostic who claimed to be an incarnation of God (as conceived by the Gnostics), reportedly had the ability to levitate, along with many other magical powers.
Mani, founder of Manichaeism, was reputed to be able to levitate.

Hellenism
It was believed in Hellenism (the pagan religion of Ancient Greece and Ancient Rome) on the testimony of Philostratus that upon his death, Apollonius of Tyana underwent heavenly assumption by levitating into Elysium.

Hinduism

In Hinduism, it is believed that some Hindu mystics and gurus who have achieved certain spiritual powers (called siddhis) are able to levitate. In Sanskrit, the power of levitation is called laghiman ('lightness') or dardura-siddhi (the 'frog power'). Yogananda's book Autobiography of a Yogi has accounts of Hindu Yogis who levitated in the course of their meditation.
Yogi Subbayah Pullavar was reported to have levitated into the air for four minutes in front of a crowd of 150 witnesses on June 6, 1936. He was seen suspended horizontally several feet above the ground, in a trance, lightly resting his hand on top of a cloth-covered stick. Pullavar's arms and legs could not be bent from their locked position once on the ground. The illusion was created by a simple method in which the person seen to levitate is supported by a cantilevered platform held up by an iron rod camouflaged in some way.

Levitation by mediums

Many mediums have claimed to have levitated during séances, especially in the 19th century in Britain and America. Many have been shown to be frauds, using wires and stage magic tricks. Daniel Dunglas Home, a prolific and well-documented levitator of himself and other objects, was said by spiritualists to levitate outside of a window. Skeptics have disputed such claims. The researchers Joseph McCabe and Trevor H. Hall exposed the "levitation" of Home as nothing more than him moving across a connecting ledge between two iron balconies.

The magician Joseph Rinn gave a full account of fraudulent behavior observed in a séance of Eusapia Palladino and explained how her levitation trick had been performed. Milbourne Christopher summarized the exposure:

"Joseph F. Rinn and Warner C. Pyne, clad in black coveralls, had crawled into the dining room of Columbia professor Herbert G. Lord's house while a Palladino seance was in progress. Positioning themselves under the table, they saw the medium's foot strike a table leg to produce raps. As the table tilted to the right, due to pressure of her right hand on the surface, they saw her put her left foot under the left table leg. Pressing down on the tabletop with her left hand and up with her left foot under the table leg to form a clamp, she lifted her foot and "levitated" the table from the floor."

The levitation trick of the medium Jack Webber was exposed by the magician Julien Proskauer. According to Proskauer he would use a telescopic reaching rod attached to a trumpet to levitate objects in the séance room. The physicist Edmund Edward Fournier d'Albe investigated the medium Kathleen Goligher at many sittings and concluded that no paranormal phenomena such as levitation had occurred with Goligher and stated he had found evidence of fraud. D'Albe had claimed the ectoplasm substance in the photographs of Goligher from her séances were made from muslin.

In photography
A person photographed while bouncing may appear to be levitating. This optical illusion is used by religious groups and by spiritualist mediums, claiming that their meditation techniques allow them to levitate in the air. Usually telltale signs can be found in the photography indicating that the subject was in the act of bouncing, like blurry body parts, a flailing scarf, hair being suspended in the air, etc.

Levitation in popular culture

Literature
Incidents in my Life autobiography by Daniel Dunglas Home
Mr. Vertigo novel by Paul Auster

Film
The Exorcist (1973), directed by William Friedkin
The Boy Who Could Fly (1986), directed by Nick Castle
Candyman film series  directed by Bernard Rose (1992); Bill Condon (1995); Turi Meyer (1999); Nia DaCosta (2021)

TV shows
Stranger things, season 4 (2022)

See also
 Indian rope trick
 List of topics characterized as pseudoscience
 Mysticism
 Psychokinesis

References

Further reading

External links
Levitation by Mark Edward 
Levitation – Skeptic's Dictionary
The Flying Mystics of Tibetan Buddhism art exhibit, Oglethorpe University, 2004

New Age practices
Paranormal terminology
Parapsychology
Flight folklore